Alexander Doom (born 25 April 1997) is a Belgian sprinter specialising in the 400 metres. He represented his country at the 2021 European Indoor Championships finishing fourth in the 4 × 400 metres relay.

International competitions

1Disqualified in the semifinals
2Did not finish in the final
3Did not start in the final

Personal bests
Outdoor
200 metres – 21.10 (+0.6 m/s, Sint-Niklaas 2022)
400 metres – 45.34 (Brussels 2021)
Indoor
200 metres – 22.10 (Ghent 2017)
400 metres – 46.86 (Ghent 2022)

References

External links
 
 
 

1997 births
Living people
Belgian male sprinters
Athletes (track and field) at the 2020 Summer Olympics
Olympic athletes of Belgium
European Athletics Championships medalists